Hegersport GmbH is a German auto racing company which serves as organizer for German Porsche Sports Cup series, as well as a racing team which competed in the FIA GT1 World Championship under the title Triple H Team Hegersport.  The company was formed in 2000 by racing drivers Altfrid Heger and Christof Maischak in Essen, Germany, originally organizing the V8Star Series for touring cars in Germany and across Europe.  Following the end of the V8Stars series in 2004, Hegersport coordinated with Porsche Germany to establish the Sports Cup series, a national series for Porsche drivers.  Hegersport also serves as a private customer event organizer, and provides training and safety courses for individuals.

In 2010 Hegersport became one of two teams nominated to represent Maserati in the inaugural FIA GT1 World Championship.  Altfrid Heger returned to driving duties as part of the team, joined by such drivers as former FIA GT Champion Matteo Bobbi and successful sports car drivers Bert Longin and Alex Müller.

References

External links
 Hegersport 

German auto racing teams
FIA GT1 World Championship teams

Auto racing teams established in 2000